Pultenaea parrisiae, commonly known as bantam bush-pea, or Parris's bush-pea, is a species of flowering plant in the family Fabaceae and is endemic to south eastern continental Australia. It is a low-lying sub-shrub with linear to lance-shaped leaves with the narrower end towards the base, and yellow to purple flowers with red markings.

Description
The edges of the leaves are curved downwards and the upper surface is concave.

Taxonomy
Pultenaea parrisiae was first formally described in 1994 by John D. Briggs and Michael Crisp in the journal Telopea from specimens collected by Briggs in Wadbilliga National Park in 1988. The specific epithet (parrisiae) honours the amateur botanist, Mrs Margaret Parris who drew the attention of Briggs and Crisp to the species.

Distribution and habitat
Bantam bush-pea grows in moist heathland, sometimes at forest edges or near streams in the South East Forests and Wadbilliga National Parks in far south-eastern New South Wales and north-east Gippsland in Victoria.

Conservation status
Pultenaea parrisiae is listed as "vulnerable" under the Australian Government Environment Protection and Biodiversity Conservation Act 1999, the New South Wales Government Biodiversity Conservation Act 2016 and the Victorian Government Flora and Fauna Guarantee Act 1988.

References

Fabales of Australia
Flora of New South Wales
Flora of Victoria (Australia)
parrisiae
Plants described in 1994